The Amawalk Reservoir is a small reservoir in the New York City water supply system located in central-northern Westchester County, New York. It is located at the intersection of U.S. Route 202 and New York State Route 35 in the town of Somers, and is over 32 miles (over 51 kilometres) north of New York City. Part of the system's Croton Watershed, it was formed by impounding the middle of the Muscoot River, one of the tributaries of the Croton River. This reservoir was put into service in 1897, and was named after the original community of Amawalk, New York, which was inundated by the reservoir and relocated near the dam.

The reservoir is one of the smaller  in NYC's water supply system. It is only about 3 miles (4.8 kilometres) long.

Water which is either released or spilled out of Amawalk Reservoir flows south in the Muscoot River and eventually enters the Muscoot Reservoir, and then flows into the New Croton Reservoir. The water enters the New Croton Aqueduct, which sends water to the Jerome Park Reservoir in the Bronx, where the water is distributed to the Bronx and to northern Manhattan. On average, the New Croton Aqueduct delivers 10% of New York City's drinking water. The water that doesn't enter the New Croton Aqueduct will flow into the Hudson River at Croton Point.

See also
List of reservoirs and dams in New York

References

External links 
 

Croton Watershed
Reservoirs in Westchester County, New York
Reservoirs in New York (state)
Protected areas of Westchester County, New York
Somers, New York